Klenovik is a dispersed settlement in the Municipality of Škocjan in southeastern Slovenia. Within the municipality, it belongs to the Village Community of Zagrad. The municipality is included in the Southeast Slovenia Statistical Region and was part of the historical region of Lower Carniola.

References

External links
Klenovik at Geopedia

Populated places in the Municipality of Škocjan